Macropoliana natalensis is a moth of the family Sphingidae. It is known from forests and moist woodland from KwaZulu-Natal to Ethiopia and westwards to Cameroon, Ghana and Sierra Leone.

The length of the forewings is 55–70 mm for males and 65–75 mm for females and the wingspan is 107–126 mm. The forewings are very pale grey with wavy blackish transverse bands and a whitish stigma. There are two short longitudinal blackish streaks in the centre of the wing. The head is pale grey and the thorax is pale grey surrounded dorsally by black lines edged internally with yellow. The abdomen is pale grey, mottled and faintly spotted with darker grey. The hindwings are dark greyish brown, with a large pale grey patch near the tornus. Females are larger, have broader forewings and are usually darker and more heavily marked.

The larvae feed on Spathodea nilotica, Spathodea campanulata, Markhamia lutea and Brachystegia species. The larvae are generally pale green, but turn olive-purple immediately before pupation. Pupation takes place under ground in a dark brown pupa.

References

Macropoliana
Moths described in 1875
Moths of Africa